Are You Tougher Than a Boy Scout? is an American reality television series on the National Geographic Channel that debuted on March 4, 2013. It features Scouting-themed competitions between adults and members of the Boy Scouts of America. The show is hosted by Charles Ingram, a former Army Ranger.

The producers of the show had to find a location to host the show for activities such as Whitewater rafting, rappelling, wilderness navigation and canoe jousting (admittedly a new addition to the Boy Scout skill set). Camp Whitsett, which rests in the heights of the Sequoia National Monument near Lake Ida and the mighty Kern River, was chosen for its traditional Mountain Camp ambiance as well as the rugged terrain that could challenge even the most practiced outdoorsman.

Cast

 Will "Big South" Fleming
 Rio "Wolf" Gifford
 Rob "Robin Hood" Nelsen
 Bobby "Lash" Lefevre
 Kevin "Bug Bite" Graves
 Garret "Shark Fin" Rios
 Keegan "Yeti" Rice
 Michael "Hitch" Henderson
 Brenan "Hawk" Corbin
 Trent "Benz" Buenzli
 Diallo "Torpedo" Whitaker
 Denicio "Toro" Drake-Gonzales

Episodes

Controversy
The show generated a significant backlash against the network for their association with the Boy Scouts of America, an organization that, prior to 2014, banned openly gay scouts. An online petition urging National Geographic to issue a disclaimer before the show was rejected by National Geographic, responding that "It is against our network’s policy to air any disclaimer other than those warning that 'Viewer Discretion is Advised' due to content".

It was reported that the series is part of a "strategic partnership" with the National Geographic Channel, to describe the series as a tool to push the idea that "Scouting is 'cool' with youth". It goes on to state that the Boy Scouts of America will continue to work on marketing plans with National Geographic for "leveraging the show with Scouting audiences and audiences outside of scouting".

References

External links
 National Geographic Channel show website
 Boy Scouts of America show website
 

2010s American reality television series
2013 American television series debuts
2013 American television series endings
English-language television shows
National Geographic (American TV channel) original programming
Television series by Original Productions
Boy Scouts of America
Television shows filmed in California